Roel Bovendeert  is a Dutch field hockey player who plays as a forward for Hoofdklasse club Bloemendaal.

Club career
Bovendeert started playing hockey at MEP where he played his whole youth career. In 2009 he signed for Bloemendaal. During the winter break of the 2019–20 season he played for UniKL in the Malaysia Hockey League and won the treble with UniKL.

International career
Bovendeert represented the Netherlands at the 2020 Summer Olympics. After the 2020 Olympics he retired from international hockey.

References

External links

1992 births
Living people
Dutch male field hockey players
Male field hockey forwards
Field hockey players at the 2020 Summer Olympics
Olympic field hockey players of the Netherlands
HC Bloemendaal players
Men's Hoofdklasse Hockey players
People from Boxtel
Sportspeople from North Brabant